Takuro Miuchi (箕内 拓郎, Miuchi Takuro, born December 11, 1975) is a Japanese rugby union player, who plays number eight. He was captain of the Japan national rugby union team until relieved of that responsibility by Japan national team coach Jean-Pierre Elissalde in a surprise move during February 2006. He was recalled to the team for the IRB Pacific 5 Nations games, and has appeared in 2 World Cups - 2003 and 2007.

He also plays for NEC Green Rockets in the Top League, and was the NEC captain before Ryota Asano.

Under John Kirwan (appointed head coach January 1, 2007) he again became captain of Japan, and appeared in the Japanese squad for the 2007 World Cup and the 2008 IRB Pacific Nations Cup.

Early life

Takuro is originally from Tobata ward in Kitakyushu city. He first learned rugby at Sayagatani rugby school, and played also for Yahata High School.

He played as a student for Kanto Gakuin University and for a year at Oxford University where he gained a blue. Miuchi's first international cap was on May 19, 2002 in a match against .

References

External links
Miuchi gets recall for Pac Five, Daily Yomiuri, May 20, 2006
Élissalde springs surprise as Miuchi gets the chop, Daily Yomiuri, February 28, 2006
Miuchi on the Rockets website

1975 births
Living people
Japanese rugby union players
Green Rockets Tokatsu players
NTT DoCoMo Red Hurricanes Osaka players
Sportspeople from Kitakyushu
Rugby union number eights
Kanto Gakuin University alumni
Japan international rugby union players
Asian Games medalists in rugby union
Rugby union players at the 2002 Asian Games
Asian Games silver medalists for Japan
Medalists at the 2002 Asian Games